Peter Benedict (born Christian Riss; 13 July 1963) is an Austrian actor, director and writer.

Early life 
Peter Benedict was born Christian Riss in Chur, Switzerland. He is the only son of actors Walter Riss and Christa Rossenbach. He grew up in Berlin, Paris and Salzburg. Benedict studied drama and film directing at Mozarteum University Salzburg and at Konrad Wolf Film University of Babelsberg.

Career 
Benedict began working in film and television productions under his birth name in the late 1980s. He wrote and directed the 1999 film Ende des Frühlings. In 2000, he started his film career as an actor. His first role was in Dominik Graf's drama A Map of the Heart. Since then, Benedict has appeared in numerous films and television shows, including Fay Grim (2006), Yella (2007), Lusitania: Murder on the Atlantic (2007), Unschuldig (2008), Barbara (2012), The Team (2015), and The Young Karl Marx (2017). 

From 2005 to 2016, he made regular appearances in the long-running crime drama Tatort. He was part of the main cast of the crime series Kommissarin Heller (2014–2019), where he portrayed the role of Burkhard Hinnrichs. From 2017 to 2020, Benedict appeared in the Netflix science fiction series Dark as Aleksander Tiedemann. He played one of the lead roles, Robert von Bergen, in the 2018–2019 dramedy series Jenny – echt gerecht.

Personal life 
Benedict is married and lives in Berlin and France.

Filmography

Film

Television

References

External links
 
 

1963 births
Living people
People from Chur
20th-century Austrian male actors
21st-century Austrian male actors
Austrian male film actors
Austrian male television actors
Austrian film directors
Austrian screenwriters
German-language film directors
Mozarteum University Salzburg alumni
Swiss people of Austrian descent
Swiss people of German descent